Bapugaon is a village in the Palghar district of Maharashtra, India. It is located in the Dahanu taluka.

Demographics 

According to the 2011 census of India, Bapugaon has 272 households. The effective literacy rate (i.e. the literacy rate of population excluding children aged 6 and below) is 57.32%.

Education 

The village has a school named Balakan-Ji-Bari-Ashram School. Many students from nearby villages come to this school for completing their schooling. The school is from 1st to 10th standard.

References 

Villages in Dahanu taluka